Submarine: A Guided Tour Inside a Nuclear Warship is a non-fiction book written by Tom Clancy and defense systems analyst John D. Gresham. Released on November 1, 1993, it is the first entry in Clancy's Guided Tour series of non-fiction books, which explore several different facets of the United States military.

The chapter 'Other people's submarines' has the history and other information about the submarines of other countries. The foreword in the Penguin edition was written by Vice Admiral Roger Bacon. An edition of this book also includes diagrams of various submarines.

Content
"Building the Boats" discusses the lengthy training process of the U.S. submarine crew, construction of submarines in the United States, and several U.S. submarine bases worldwide.

References

Books by Tom Clancy
Non-fiction books about the United States Navy
Non-fiction books about submarine warfare
1993 non-fiction books
Berkley Books books